The 2017–18 Trans-Tasman Tri-Series was a Twenty20 International (T20I) cricket tournament that was held in Australia and New Zealand in February 2018. It was a tri-nation series between Australia, England and New Zealand. It followed on from England's tour of Australia, which included the 2017–18 Ashes series, and took the place of the planned Chappell–Hadlee Trophy series. It was the first T20I tri-series contested by full ICC members.

Australia qualified for the final after winning their first three matches. They were joined in the final by New Zealand, who despite losing to England in their final group match, qualified on net run rate. Australia won the final against New Zealand, beating them by 19 runs by the Duckworth–Lewis–Stern method, after a rain-affected match.

Squads

Joe Root was named in England's initial squad, but was withdrawn before the tournament started to allow him a break from playing. Ben Stokes confirmed he would not join the England squad until after his court appearance on 13 February 2018. Stokes was charged with affray on 15 January 2018, in relation to an incident in September 2017. He pled not guilty at the court appearance and though he joined up with the squad before England's final game he did not play in the tri-series. Sam Curran and Jake Ball were both added to England's initial squad  before the series started. Australia's Aaron Finch was ruled out of the first T20I due to a hamstring injury. Tom Bruce and Tom Blundell were replaced by  Mark Chapman and Tim Seifert respectively in New Zealand's squad before their first match against England. Henry Nicholls was added to New Zealand's squad as cover for Kane Williamson who was suffering with a back injury. Ahead of 6th T20I Liam Plunkett was ruled out of England's squad for rest of the series.

Tour match

20-over: Prime Minister's XI v England XI

Points table

Fixtures

1st T20I

2nd T20I

3rd T20I

4th T20I

5th T20I

6th T20I

Final

Notes

References

External links
 Series home at ESPN Cricinfo

2018 in Australian cricket
2018 in English cricket
2018 in New Zealand cricket
International cricket competitions in 2017–18
Australian cricket tours of New Zealand
English cricket tours of Australia
English cricket tours of New Zealand
New Zealand cricket tours of Australia
Trans-Tasman Tri-Series